Nalleli Cobo is an American activist.

Biography
Nalleli Cobo was raised in South Los Angeles in a Latino family.

In 2015, she co-founded South Central Youth Leadership Coalition.

In 2022, she was included on the Time100 Next list.

Cobo is mostly known for leading a coalition that helped shut down a toxic oil-drilling site permanently.

Awards and recognition
 2022: Goldman Environmental Prize
 2022: California Energy Commission Clean Energy Hall of Fame 
 2022: TIME 100 Next 
 2022: Apolotical Top 100 Most Influential People in Climate 
 2022: Sachamama Top 100 Latinos Committed to Climate Action 
 2022: Business Insider Top 100 People Transforming Business 
 2020: Rose Braz Award for Bold Activism 
 2019: Aris and Carolyn Anagnos Culture of Liberation Award 
 2019: Center for Diverse Leadership (CDLS) Fellow
 2018: Women in Green Youth Trailblazer Award 
 2018: Liberty Hill Foundation Leader to Watch  
 2017: South Coast Air Quality Management District; Youth Leadership in Air Quality 
 2017: KCET Local Hero 
 2017: Univisión Agente de Cambio

References

Living people
Year of birth missing (living people)